Cardiaderus is a genus of ground beetles in the family Carabidae. This genus has a single species, Cardiaderus chloroticus. It is found in Bulgaria, Kazakhstan, Romania, Russia, and Ukraine.

References

External links

 

Trechinae